Tibor Czibere (born 16 October 1930) is a former Hungarian engineer and politician, who served as Minister of Education between 1988 and 1989. He is a member of the Hungarian Academy of Sciences since 1985. Czibere served as rector of the University of Miskolc between 1978 and 1986.

References
 Biography

1930 births
Living people
People from Tapolca
Education ministers of Hungary
Members of the Hungarian Academy of Sciences